There are 101 municipalities in the canton of Graubünden, Switzerland.

List 

Albula/Alvra
Andeer
Bergün Filisur
Buseno
Calanca
Cama 
Castaneda 
Cazis
Celerina/Schlarigna
Chur
Churwalden
Conters im Prättigau
Davos
Disentis/Mustér
Domat/Ems
Domleschg
Falera
Felsberg
Ferrera
Fideris
Fläsch
Flerden
Flims
Furna
Fürstenau 
Grono 
Grüsch
Ilanz/Glion
Jenaz
Jenins
Klosters-Serneus
Küblis
La Punt Chamues-ch
Laax
Landquart
Lantsch/Lenz
Leggia
Lostallo
Lumnezia
Luzein
Madulain
Maienfeld
Malans
Masein
Medel (Lucmagn)
Mesocco
Muntogna da Schons
Obersaxen Mundaun
Pontresina
Poschiavo
Rhäzüns
Rheinwald
Rongellen
Rossa
Rothenbrunnen
Roveredo
S-chanf
Safiental
Sagogn
Samedan
Samnaun
San Vittore 
Santa Maria in Calanca
Scharans
Schiers
Schluein
Schmitten 
Scuol
Seewis im Prättigau
Sils im Domleschg
Sils im Engadin/Segl
Silvaplana
Soazza
St. Moritz
Sufers
Sumvitg
Surses
Tamins
Thusis
Trimmis
Trin
Trun 
Tschappina
Tschiertschen-Praden
Tujetsch
Untervaz
Urmein
Val Müstair
Vals 
Valsot
Vaz/Obervaz
Verdabbio
Zernez
Zillis-Reischen
Zizers
Zuoz

Mergers
January 1, 2002 Camuns, Surcasti, Tersnaus and Uors-Peiden merged to form the municipality of Suraua.
January 1, 2003 Donath and Patzen-Fardün merged to form Donat. The place name "Donath" is changed to "Donat", "Patzen" to "Pazen" and "Fardün" to "Farden".
January 1, 2006 Medels im Rheinwald and Splügen merged to form Splügen.
January 1, 2007 St. Antönien and St. Antönien Ascharina merged to form St. Antönien.
January 1, 2008 Ausserferrera and Innerferrera merged to form Ferrera.
St. Peter GR and Pagig merged to form St. Peter-Pagig.
Says and Trimmis merged to form Trimmis.
January 1, 2009 Wiesen and Davos merged to form Davos.
Feldis/Veulden, Scheid, Trans and Tumegl/Tomils merged to form Tomils.
Tschierv, Fuldera, Lü, Valchava, Santa Maria Val Müstair and Müstair merged to form Val Müstair.
Flond and Surcuolm merged to form Mundaun.
Tschiertschen and Praden merged to form Tschiertschen-Praden.
Andeer, Clugin and Pignia merged to form Andeer.
January 1, 2010 Bondo, Castasegna, Soglio, Stampa and Vicosoprano merged to form Bregaglia.
Cazis, Portein, Präz, Sarn and Tartar merged to form Cazis.
Parpan, Malix and Churwalden merged to form Churwalden.
January 1, 2012 Igis and Mastrils merged to form Landquart.
January 1, 2013 Ramosch and Tschlin merged to form Valsot.
Valendas, Versam, Safien and Tenna merged to form Safiental.
Arosa, Calfreisen, Castiel, Lüen, St. Peter-Pagig, Langwies, Molinis and Peist merged to form Arosa
Cumbel, Degen, Lumbrein, Morissen, Suraua, Vignogn, Vella and Vrin merged to form Lumnezia.
January 1, 2014 Castrisch, Duvin, Ilanz, Ladir, Luven, Pigniu, Pitasch, Riein, Rueun, Ruschein, Schnaus, Sevgein and Siat merged to form Ilanz/Glion
January 1, 2015 Alvaneu, Alvaschein, Brienz/Brinzauls, Mon, Switzerland, Surava, Stierva and Tiefencastel merged to form Albula/Alvra.
St. Martin and Vals merged to form Vals.
Almens, Paspels, Pratval, Rodels and Tomils merged to form Domleschg.
Ardez, Ftan, Guarda, Scuol, Sent and Tarasp merged to form Scuol.
Lavin, Susch and Zernez merged to form Zernez.
Arvigo, Braggio, Cauco and Selma merged to form Calanca.
January 1, 2016 Bivio, Cunter, Marmorera, Mulegns, Riom-Parsonz, Salouf, Savognin, Sur and Tinizong-Rona merged to form Surses.
Mundaun and Obersaxen merged to form Obersaxen Mundaun.
Klosters-Serneus and Saas im Prättigau merged to form Klosters-Serneus.
Luzein and St. Antönien merged to form Luzein.
January 1, 2017
Grono, Leggia and Verdabbio merged to form Grono.

January 1, 2018
Mutten and Thusis merged to form Thusis.
Bergün and Filisur merged to form Bergün Filisur.
Andiast, Breil/Brigels and Waltensburg/Vuorz merged to form Breil/Brigels.

January 1, 2019
Hinterrhein, Nufenen and Splügen merged to form Rheinwald

January 1, 2020
Chur and Maladers merged to form Chur

January 1, 2021
Casti-Wergenstein, Donat, Lohn and Mathon merged to form Muntogna da Schons
Chur and Haldenstein merged to form Chur

References

Graubunden
 
Subdivisions of Graubünden